Unió Esportiva Valls is a Catalan football team based in Valls, in Tarragona province. Founded in 1980, it plays in Tercera División – Group 5, holding home matches at Camp del Vilar, which has a capacity of 2,500 spectators.

History 
The first football clubs in the history of Valls were Club Sporting Hispània FC, Valls FC, Germans Sant Gabriel and Regiment de Cavalleria, that defunct in the 1920s.

In 1922 Valls Deportiu and Atlètic Vallenc (in the 1930s Penya Sempre Avant) were founded.
Until 1969, there was no football team in Valls. That year, the football section of CB Valls was founded, which became independent in 1972.

Unió Esportiva Valls was born in 1980 with the union of Valls CF and CF Quatre Barres.

Club background
Valls Club de Futbol - (1973–1980) → ↓
Unió Esportiva Valls - (1980–present)
Club de Futbol Quatre Barres - (1972–1980) → ↑

Club names
 Unió Esportiva Valls-Quatre Barres (1980–1984)
 Unió Esportiva Valls (1984–present)

Season to season

1 season in Tercera División

References

External links 
  
 FCF team profile 
 Video of a UE Valls match

Football clubs in Catalonia
Association football clubs established in 1980
1980 establishments in Spain